The list of equipment of the Armed Forces of Ukraine can be subdivided into: infantry weapons, vehicles, aircraft, watercraft, and clothing. Note that due to the ongoing Russian invasion of Ukraine quantities of operational equipment are highly uncertain.

Infantry weapons

Handguns

Shotguns

Rifles

Semi-automatic rifles

Assault rifles

Battle rifles

Sniper rifles

Submachine guns

Machine guns

Grenades and launchers

Smoke grenades

Hand grenades

Anti-tank grenades

Grenade launchers

Anti-materiel and anti-tank weapons

Anti-materiel rifles

Anti-tank rifles

Recoilless rifles

Anti-fortification

Rocket-propelled grenades

Anti-tank guided missiles

Flamethrowers

Man-portable air-defense systems

Mortars

Light mortars

Heavy mortars

Land mines

Anti-personnel mines

Anti-tank mines

Combat vehicles

Tanks

Main battle tanks

Tank destroyers

Infantry fighting vehicles

Armoured personnel carriers

Tracked personnel carriers

Wheeled armoured personnel carriers

Infantry mobility vehicles

Reconnaissance vehicles

Wheeled reconnaissance vehicles

Field artillery

Towed mortars and anti-tank guns

Self-propelled mortars

Towed artillery

Self-propelled artillery

Multiple rocket launchers

Ground and Sea launched Missile systems

Air defense systems 
Long and medium air defense is under the authority of the Air Defense Forces of the Ukrainian Air Force. See their equipment.

Towed anti-aircraft guns

Self-propelled anti-aircraft guns

Surface-to-air missile systems

Radars
Radar for long and medium air defense are under Radiolocation Forces authority of the Ukrainian Air Force. See their equipment.

Electronic warfare and communication

Communication equipment
Jammers
Eavesdropping equipment

Electronic warfare and Jammers

Engineering

Recovery vehicles

Clearing vehicles

Minelayers

Construction vehicles

Bridges

Ships and underwater vehicles

Medical

Tracked ambulances

Wheeled protected ambulances

Wheeled ambulances

Logistics

Utility vehicles

Cargo vehicles

Tractor units

Trucks

Ammunition carriers

Aircraft

Fixed-wing aircraft

Helicopters
<

Air Armaments

Unmanned aerial vehicles and autonomous vehicles

Reconnaissance unmanned aerial vehicles

Unmanned combat aerial vehicle

Cargo drones

Loitering munitions

Ordnance dropping drones

Uniforms

Camouflages

Armor

Hazmat equipment

Night Vision

See also 
List of equipment of the National Guard of Ukraine
List of armoured fighting vehicles of Ukraine

References

External links
 

Ukraine
Military equipment of Ukraine
Military of Ukraine
equipment